Marcel Granollers was the defending champion but chose not to defend his title.

Henri Laaksonen won the title after defeating Dudi Sela 6–2, 6–4 in the final.

Seeds
All seeds receive a bye into the second round.

Draw

Finals

Top half

Section 1

Section 2

Bottom half

Section 3

Section 4

References
Main Draw
Qualifying Draw

Singles